This is a discography of the recordings of Horace Silver  (September 2, 1928 – June 18, 2014), an American hard bop jazz pianist. His major discography consists of 36 studio albums, 3 live albums and 7 compilations.

Silver was initially a sideman, first recording in 1950, then a leader of mainly small groups. He was a founding member of The Jazz Messengers, originally run cooperatively, later by drummer Art Blakey alone. After leaving the Messengers, Silver led a five-piece combo into the 1980s. The vast majority of Silver's recordings as a leader were for the Blue Note label.

Studio albums

Live albums

Compilation albums

Singles (78s and 45s)

Albums recorded with The Jazz Messengers

In addition to Horace Silver and the Jazz Messengers listed above, Silver recorded two live albums, a studio album and portions of two more compilation albums as co-leader of the original Jazz Messengers with Art Blakey.

Albums recorded as a sideman

Notes

References

 

Jazz discographies
Discographies of American artists